Lancaster (Forton) services is a motorway service station, between junctions 32 and 33 of the M6 motorway in England. The nearest city is Lancaster, about seven miles (11 km) to the north. The site is operated by Moto.

Like many older service stations, it has an all-weather enclosed bridge which enables pedestrians to use both the northbound and southbound facilities. In 2005 this bridge had work carried out to strengthen it to withstand the impact of a heavy goods vehicle.

History
In September 1964, it was due to open in April 1965, when it was announced that all Rank Organisation service areas would have showers and rest rooms for truck drivers, starting with Forton. The company felt that truck drivers were often overlooked, and that truck drivers previously had a 'smoke and a sandwich in a lay-by'. These views came from John Davis, chairman of The Rank Organisation, at the awards ceremony of the Lorry Driver of the Year awards near Nuneaton on Sunday 13 September 1964, won by 32 year old John Gunn of Ottawa Road in Leicester, employed by Wolsey Ltd of Leicester; the competition had started in Coventry in 1952.

Construction
It opened in November 1965 with the name Forton services, it was the second service station to open on the motorway (Charnock Richard being the first), and is named after the nearby village of Forton. The architect was T. P. Bennett and Son and it was originally operated by The Rank Organisation (Top Rank Motor Inns). T. P. Bennett and Son's first design for service areas was Strensham services; Forton was its second. Farthing Corner (Medway services) on the M2 was the first Top Rank to open, followed by Knutsford.

It was opened on the Preston-Lancaster section of the M6. Junction 33 (A6) is to the north and junction 32 (M55) is to the south; the section opened in 1965.

Structure
The services is notable for an unusual hexagonal concrete tower on the northbound side, named  The Pennine Tower, which originally housed an up-market restaurant and a sun deck. The tower was designed to resemble an air Ttraffic control tower and is a prominent local landmark. The tower is 74 ft across.

The tower closed to the public in 1989 due to current fire regulations (there is no means of providing an alternative exit from the restaurant deck in an emergency), and is only used for storage and occasional staff training. The tower was built to give views over Morecambe Bay to the west and the Trough of Bowland to the east. Recently, Moto has refreshed the services. The tower has been painted in a beige colour and one of the passenger lifts has been refurbished.

The tower was listed Grade II on 15 October 2012.

The site's eastern edge is the boundary between Wyre district and City of Lancaster district.

There is a Burger King and Costa Coffee on each side of the service station. The services also has a Marks and Spencers Simply Food store and a Greggs.

References

External links

Lancaster Services - Motorway Services Online

1965 establishments in England
Buildings and structures in the Borough of Wyre
Commercial buildings completed in 1965
Economy of Lancashire
M6 motorway service stations
Moto motorway service stations
Transport in Lancashire
Transport infrastructure completed in 1965